The National Ringette League playoffs are the knockout match, round robin, and tournament for determining the champion for National Ringette League (NRL).

The National Ringette League (NRL) playoffs began during the league's second season which was the 2005-06 season. In 2008, the NRL playoffs replaced the national championships for the Under-19 years and Open divisions at the Canadian Ringette Championships and have been conducted in this manner since.

The 2010–11 season introduced the new "NRL Championship Tournament" replacing the Championship qualifying rounds and takes place in just one city with the intention of allowing the league to create a media event and to hold attention. The top 10 teams in the league's regular season participate in the championship tournament crowning the team champion of the league. Starting in the 2011–12 season, 8 teams played a full round robin known as the "Elite Eight" to determine the champion.

Format 

The current format consists of three parts: Knockout match, Elite Eight, and Tournament.
Knockout Stage: the best-of-three match to determine which of the three Eastern conference teams and which one of the Western conference teams advance to the Elite Eight.
Elite Eight: the eight-team round robin matches. Each team plays seven games one time. These games began being held in one city starting in the 2011-12 season.
Championship Tournament: the semifinal and final. Second and third place teams in Elite Eight go to the semifinal, and the winner goes against the top team in Elite Eight.

History

Final results

Records 

All records are from 2011 playoffs.
 Stats updated as of end of 2018 playoffs.

Playoffs appearance

Team records 

 The overtime loss(es) will be counted as OTL in team records but not in final game records.

Final game record

Notes and references

Playoffs
Ringette
Ringette competitions